Vladimir Alexandrovich Lugovskoy (July 1, 1901 Moscow - June 5, 1957 Yalta) was a constructivist poet known for writing the choir of "Arise, Russian People!" for the film Alexander Nevsky. In later years, his poetry became filled with imagery and emotion.

Born in to the family of a teacher of the First Moscow Gymnasium and a mother who was a professional singer.

He graduated from the gymnasium and entered the Moscow State University but his studies were cut short after he was enrolled in the Red Army's Western Front and served in a field hospital.

After returning from the front he started study at the general school of Vsevobuch. He served in the department  of internal affairs of the Kremlin and in the military school of the All-Russian Central Executive Committee. The Russian Revolution, the subsequent Civil War, Russian history and the nature of the North, where the poet's father came from, formed the initial circle of impressions and poetic images of V.A Lugovsky.

Lugovskoy began writing poetry in 1924 and associated himself with the constructivists. In 1930 he joined the Russian Association of Proletarian Writers and became a member of the editorial staff of the magazine "Banner".

He participated as a war correspondent in the Polish campaign of the Soviet Union in 1939. However he didn't participate in World War II due to his health complications and was evaluated to Tashkent in 1941.

V. A. Lugovskoy died on June 5, 1957 in Yalta . He is buried in Moscow at the Novodevichy cemetery.

Works 

 Flashes. - M .: Uzel, 1926;
 Muscle. - M .: Federation, 1929 (the collection is full of rational pathos of self-giving to the masses);
 The suffering of my friends. - M .: Federation, 1930;
 To the Bolsheviks of the desert and spring. - M., 1930, 1931, 1933, 1934, 1937, 1948;
 Poems (1923-1930). - M., 1931;
 Europe. - M .: Federation, 1932 (collection of publicistic poems);
 East and West. - M., 1932;
 Selected Poems. - M., 1932;
 A life. - M .: Soviet Literature, 1933;
 Selected Poems. - M., 1935;
 One-volume work. - M., 1935;
 Caspian Sea. - M .: Goslitizdat, 1936;
 New poems. - M., 1941;
Poems and poems. - Simferopol, 1941;
Favorites. - M., 1949;
Poems about Uzbekistan. - Tashkent, 1949;
Owners of the land. - M., 1949;
Poems. - M., Goslitizdat, 1952;
Desert and Spring (1937–52). - M., Soviet writer, 1953;
Crimean poems. - Simferopol, 1954;
Lyrics. - M .: Soviet writer, 1955;
Song of the Wind. - M., 1955;
Poems about Turkmenistan. - Ashgabat, 1955;
Solstice. - M., Soviet writer, 1956;
Middle of the century, 1958 (lyric-epic work, consisting of 25 poems)
Blue Spring, 1958;
Meditation on Poetry, 1960

References

1901 births
1957 deaths
Russian male poets
20th-century Russian poets
20th-century Russian male writers